Leptopelis nordequatorialis, also known as the West Cameroon forest treefrog, is a species of frog in the family Arthroleptidae. It is found in central and western Cameroon (Bamileke Plateau, Bamenda Highlands, and Adamawa Plateau) and eastern Nigeria (Mambilla Plateau). It is closely related to Leptopelis anchietae and Leptopelis oryi.

Description
Adult males measure  and adult females  in snout–vent length. The digits have neither discs nor webbing. Males have conspicuous pectoral glands. The dorsum is green and has a dark brown lateral stripe that runs from the snout to the groin. Sometimes there are rows of dark spots that form two dorsolateral lines. The tibia are short. The tadpoles reach  in total length.

The male advertisement call is a very sonorous clack lasting about one tenth of a second, sometimes uttered twice.

Habitat and conservation
Breeding takes place in still water and marshes, and calling males have been observed at tiny springs and seepage points. It is an abundant species that can survive in highly degraded habitats; there are no serious threats to it. It has not been found in any protected areas.

References

nordequatorialis
Frogs of Africa
Amphibians of West Africa
Amphibians of Cameroon
Fauna of Nigeria
Taxa named by Jean-Luc Perret
Amphibians described in 1966
Taxonomy articles created by Polbot
Fauna of the Cameroonian Highlands forests